Inniss is a surname. People with this name include:
 Clifford Inniss (1910–1998), Barbadian cricketer and judge
 Jennifer Inniss (born 1959), American long jumper and sprinter of Guyanese descent
 Probyn Inniss (born 1936), Governor of Saint Christopher-Nevis-Anguilla and Governor of Saint Christopher and Nevis 
 Ryan Inniss (born 1995), English footballer